George Panikulam (born 26 October 1942) is a bishop of the Syro-Malabar Catholic Church who spent his career in the diplomatic service of the Holy See. He was given the title of nuncio in 1999 and consecrated a bishop in 2000. He retired in 2017.

Biography 
He was born in Puthenchira, Kerala, India, on 26 October 1942. He studied at the minor seminary in Thope, Thrissur, and St. Joseph’s Pontifical Seminary in Aluva. He was ordained a priest on 11 March 1967 by Archbishop George Alapatt. He continued his studies in Rome, earning a doctorate in sacred scripture and licenciate in canon law and theology. He studied at the Pontifical Ecclesiastical Academy to prepare for a diplomat’s career beginning in 1975..

He was appointed Titular Archbishop of Caudium and Apostolic Nuncio to Honduras on 4 December 1999. He was consecrated a bishop on 6 January 2000 by Pope John Paul II.

He was appointed Apostolic Nuncio to Mozambique on 3 July 2003.

On 24 October 2008 he was named Apostolic Nuncio to Ethiopia and Apostolic Delegate to Somalia. He was given additional responsibilities as Apostolic Nuncio to Djibouti on 18 December 2008.

He was named Apostolic Nuncio to Uruguay on 14 June 2014.

He retired in October 2017 at the age of 75.

See also
 List of heads of the diplomatic missions of the Holy See

References

External links
Catholic Hierarchy: Archbishop George Panikulam 

1942 births
20th-century Indian Roman Catholic priests
21st-century Roman Catholic titular archbishops
Living people
Syro-Malabar archbishops
Apostolic Nuncios to Mozambique
Apostolic Nuncios to Ethiopia
Apostolic Nuncios to Uruguay
Apostolic Nuncios to Djibouti
Apostolic Nuncios to Honduras
Apostolic Nuncios to Somalia